Stagecoach to Fury is a 1956 American Western film directed by William F. Claxton and starring Forrest Tucker and Mari Blanchard. It was the first film from Robert L. Lippert's Regal films; the B picture unit of 20th Century Fox set up to provide second features shot in CinemaScope.

The film, with exteriors shot around Kanab, Utah was nominated for an Academy Award for black-and-white cinematography for the 29th Academy Awards.

Others in the film include Wallace Ford as Judge Lester Farrell, Ellen Corby as Sarah Farrell, Wright King as Ralph Slader, Paul Fix as Tim O'Connors, and Rodolfo Hoyos Jr., as Lorenzo Gracia.

Plot
A stagecoach with a mixed group of passenger en route to the town of Fury makes a stop at a layover. Upon arrival the passengers are held up by Lorenzo Garcia and his gang of bandidos capture and disarm the passengers, shooting one when he stops to raise his fallen trousers when he puts his hands up. The two staff of the coaching stop are missing presumed murdered. Garcia questions former Army captain Frank Townsend, now riding shotgun on the stagecoach on the location of the Federal Government gold shipment they expected to be carried by the stagecoach. After Garcia shoots and wounds Tim O'Connor the driver to encourage information, Townsend reveals that the stagecoach was to remain at the layover until a wagon containing the gold shipment would arrive and transfer the cargo to the stage.

Garcia holds the prisoners as his band awaits the gold shipment. Among the surviving passengers are young gunslinger Ralph Slader, who the bandidos are eager to have a gunfight with, a cowardly judge escaping from the vengeance of criminals, a scheming woman who has arranged to rob and murder her husband and Townsend's fiancée. Though Garcia explains the passengers will remain safe if they follow his orders, Townsend feels that Garcia would not want any witnesses to his robbery to be left alive.

Cast

Production
Parts of the film were shot in the Gap in Utah.

Reception
The film grossed $250,000 in its first five months and Variety estimated it to earn $600,000.

Quotes
"Justice sometimes moves in strange company. Its judgement is not always empty. Though its sting be cruel."

See also
List of American films of 1956

References

External links

1956 films
1956 Western (genre) films
CinemaScope films
American Western (genre) films
American black-and-white films
Films shot in Utah
Films scored by Paul Dunlap
20th Century Fox films
Films directed by William F. Claxton
1950s English-language films
1950s American films